Synactia is a genus of parasitic flies in the family Tachinidae. There are at least two described species in Synactia.

Species
These two species belong to the genus Synactia:
 Synactia carbonata Mesnil, 1963
 Synactia parvula (Rondani, 1861)

References

Further reading

 
 
 
 

Tachinidae
Articles created by Qbugbot